The 1987 Pilkington Glass Championships was a women's tennis tournament played on grass courts at the Devonshire Park Lawn Tennis Club in Eastbourne, United Kingdom and was part of Category 4 tier of the 1987 WTA Tour. It was the 13th edition of the tournament and ran from 15 June until 20 June 1987. Third-seeded Helena Suková won the singles title.

Finals

Singles
 Helena Suková defeated  Martina Navratilova 7–6(7–5), 6–3
 It was Suková's 2nd singles title of the year and the 6th of her career.

Doubles
 Svetlana Parkhomenko /  Larisa Savchenko defeated  Rosalyn Fairbank /  Elizabeth Smylie 7–6(7–5), 4–6, 7–5

Notes

References

External links
 Official website
 ITF tournament edition details
 Tournament draws

Pilkington Glass Championships
Eastbourne International
Pilkington Glass Championships
Pilkington Glass Championships
1987 in English women's sport